Donna Woolfolk Cross (born 1947) is an American writer and the author of the novel Pope Joan, about a female Catholic Pope from 853 to 855.  She is the daughter of Dorothy Woolfolk, a pioneering woman in the American comic book industry, and of novelist William Woolfolk.

Biography
Donna Woolfolk Cross received her bachelor's degree in English from the University of Pennsylvania in 1969, graduating Phi Beta Kappa. She worked as an editorial assistant for the London, England, publishing company W.H. Allen and Company, then returned to the U.S. to work for the New York City advertising agency Young & Rubicam. She returned to college to earn a master's degree in Literature and Writing from UCLA.  She later became a full-time author, and has published four non-fiction books and one novel.

Bibliography

Non-fiction
Word Abuse: How the Words We Use Use Us (1979) 
Daddy's Little Girl: The Unspoken Bargain Between Fathers and Their Daughters (1983) (with William Woolfolk) 
Mediaspeak: How Television Makes Up Your Mind (1984) 
Speaking of Words: A Language Reader (1986) (with James MacKillop)

Novels
Pope Joan (1996) 
This novel based on Emmanuel Roidis (28/7/1836 – 7/1/1904) fiction novel written in 1866 with original name "Medieval Study".
For this novel Roidis was condemned from both orthodox and catholic church and went to court.

References
 Official Pope Joan site: Author biography
The New York Times (May 28, 2001): "Authors Go Directly to Reader With Marketing". by Pamela Licalzi O'Connell

External links
ReadGroupGuides.com: Author Interview

1947 births
20th-century American women writers
Living people
21st-century American women writers